North Burnet–Gateway (NBG) is a 2,300 acre neighborhood in northwest Austin, Texas bordered by Walnut Creek to the north, US 183 to the south and southwest, Metric Boulevard to the east, Braker Lane to the northwest, and MoPac (Loop 1) to the west.

History
In 2006, the City of Austin established the North Burnet/Gateway 2035 Master Plan. It adopted the North Burnet/Gateway Neighborhood Plan on November 1, 2007, and the North Burnet/Gateway Regulating Plan in 2009.

Education

Public primary and secondary education
North Burnet-Gateway is served by the Austin Independent School District. Students in the neighborhood are zoned for one of three elementary schools (Pillow Elementary School, Summit Elementary School, or Davis Elementary School), one of two middle schools (Burnet Middle School or Murchison Middle School) and Anderson High School.

Higher education
The Austin Community College Northridge Campus is located in North Burnet-Gateway, as is the University of Texas at Austin J. J. Pickle Research Campus.

Economy
The Domain, a commercial and residential complex sometimes referred to Austin's "second downtown", is located in North Burnet-Gateway.

Recreation
The North Burnet-Gateway neighborhood is bordered to the north by the Walnut Creek greenbelt.

Sports
North Burnet-Gateway is the site of Q2 Stadium, home to Austin FC soccer club.

See also
 List of Austin neighborhoods

References

External links
 North Burnet–Gateway at AustinTexas.gov

Neighborhoods in Austin, Texas